Parry Thomas is the name of:

 J. G. Parry-Thomas (1884–1927), racecar driver
 E. Parry Thomas (1921–2016), Las Vegas banker